Barry Ryan (born Barry Sapherson; 24 October 1948 – 28 September 2021), and also known as  Barry Davison, was an English pop singer and photographer. He achieved his initial success in the mid 1960s in a duo with his twin brother Paul. After Paul ceased performing to concentrate solely on songwriting, Barry became a solo artist. Barry's most successful hit, "Eloise", reached number 2 on the UK Singles Chart in 1968.

In the mid-1970s, Barry began his 40-year career as a fashion and portrait photographer. He worked for magazines such as Italian Vogue and David Bailey’s Ritz; he sold six photographs to the National Portrait Gallery; and he made portraits of celebrities such as Ronald Reagan, Margaret Thatcher, Stephen Hawking, Sting, Paul McCartney, and Björk.

Early life
Barry Ryan was born in Leeds, West Riding of Yorkshire, England, the son of pop singer Marion Ryan and antiques dealer Fred Sapherson. Fred left when Barry and Paul were two; they were brought up until they were 11 by their grandmother. Then, both boys boarded at Fulneck School in Pudsey, outside Leeds.

Pop career

When the boys were 16, the family moved to London. Their mother suggested they try a career as singers. Her boyfriend and then husband, impresario Harold Davison, managed the brothers; Paul and Barry signed with Decca Records in 1965 under the name of Paul & Barry Ryan.

Within two years they had amassed eight Top 50 singles in the UK. Their best sellers were "Don't Bring Me Your Heartaches", a number 13 hit in 1965, "I Love Her", a number 17 hit in 1966 and "Have Pity on the Boy", a number 18 hit the same year.

Paul Ryan opted out of the stress of show business, and Barry continued as a solo artist, enabling his brother to stay out of the limelight and concentrate on writing songs. Their greatest achievement as a composer-singer duo, then for MGM Records, was "Eloise", a number 2 hit in 1968. Melodramatic and heavily orchestrated, it sold over one million copies and was awarded a gold disc. "Love Is Love", their next chart entry, also became a million-seller.

Ryan was also popular in Germany and France. The single "Red Man" reached number 2 in the French chart in 1971. Promoted by Bravo, the German youth magazine, he recorded a number of songs in German. "Die Zeit macht nur vor dem Teufel halt" ("Time Only Stops for the Devil"; English recording as "Today" released on the album Red Man in 1971) peaked at number 8.

Barry stopped performing in the early 1970s. He made a comeback in the late 1990s when a two CD set with his and his brother's old songs was released. Barry was also part of the "Solid Silver '60s Tour" of the United Kingdom in 2003, singing "Eloise" backed by the Dakotas.

Photography career
Barry also maintained a successful career as a fashion photographer, from the late 1970s, and his photographs appeared in such magazines as Ritz and Zoom.  In the 1990s, he worked on a photographic project commemorating his brother Paul. Six of his photographic portraits were purchased by the National Portrait Gallery, London for its permanent collection in 1994.

Personal life
Barry Ryan was married to Christine Davison, and had two children, Jack Davison (18 April 1995) and Sophia Davison (4 September 1996).

He was also briefly married to Tunku (Princess) Miriam binti al-Marhum Sultan Sir Ibrahim (born 1950), the only child of Sultan Ibrahim of Johor and his sixth wife, Sultana Marcella (née Marcella Mendl). Married in 1976 and divorced in 1980, they had no children.

Barry's mother married Harold Davison. In 1984, Barry changed his name by deed poll to Barry Davison. In 1992, Barry's brother Paul died of cancer. In 1995, Barry married Christine Goodliff. They had a son and daughter.

Barry Ryan died on 28 September 2021, after complications from a lung disorder.

Discography

References

External links

Discography

2017 interview by Jason Barnard, Strange Brew

1948 births
2021 deaths
Photographers from Yorkshire
English pop singers
English male singers
Singers from Leeds
English twins
20th-century English singers